Gregory Adams Kimble (October 21, 1917 – January 15, 2006) was an American general psychologist and a professor at Duke University, a position from which he retired in 1984. He was known for his efforts to unify psychology as a single scientific discipline, and for his lifelong devotion to behaviorism. He also served as an advisor to the magazine Psychology Today in the 1980s, when it was owned by the American Psychological Association (APA), of which he became a fellow in 1951. His positions at the APA itself included presidency of its Divisions of General Psychology and Experimental Psychology. He received the APA's Award for Distinguished Career Contributions to Education and Training in 1999, as well as the C. Alan Boneau Award from the APA's Division of General Psychology.

References

1917 births
2006 deaths
People from Mason City, Iowa
20th-century American psychologists
Duke University faculty
University of Iowa alumni
Fellows of the American Psychological Association